Janet L. Duprey (born November 27, 1945) is a former Republican member of the New York State Assembly, representing Assembly District 115, which includes all of Clinton and Franklin Counties, as well as part of St. Lawrence County. She is originally from Plattsburgh.

Duprey was first elected to the Assembly on November 7, 2006. She ran uncontested in the November 2008 general election

She won the 2010 Republican primary election running against David Kimmel, a small business owner. She then faced Rudy Johnson, a former energy analyst and small businessman, in the general election, which she won with 59 percent of the vote. Duprey did not seek re-election in 2016.

Positions
Duprey supports gay and lesbian rights and voted in favor of a bill to introduce same sex marriage in New York State.

Duprey sponsored a resolution to create a day of awareness for individuals diagnosed with Asperger syndrome.

In 2013, Duprey was a signatory to an amicus curiae brief submitted to the Supreme Court in support of same-sex marriage during the Hollingsworth v. Perry case.

Family
Duprey and her husband Elmer have two grown children, John and Michelle.

References

External links
Janet Duprey For Assembly, campaign website
David Kimmel For Assembly, campaign website
Rudy Johnson For Assembly, campaign website

|-

|-

1945 births
Autism activists
Living people
Republican Party members of the New York State Assembly
Women state legislators in New York (state)
21st-century American politicians
21st-century American women politicians